Henry Edwards  (1856 – 1913) was a Welsh international footballer. He was part of the Wales national football team, playing 8 matches. He played his first match on 23 March 1878 against Scotland and his last match on 12 March 1887 against Ireland. At club level, he played for Wrexham and Wrexham Civil Service.

See also
 List of Wales international footballers (alphabetical)

References

External links
 
 

1856 births
Welsh footballers
Wales international footballers
Wrexham A.F.C. players
Place of birth missing
Date of death missing
1913 deaths
Association football defenders